The Young Americans is a 1993 crime drama that marked the feature film debut of British director Danny Cannon and his friend David Arnold, best known for composing scores for five of the James Bond films.

Premise
Harvey Keitel plays an American Drug Enforcement Agent who travels to London to apprehend a gangster (Viggo Mortensen) who has formed a new gang of sociopathic teenagers trying to imitate American culture.

Cast
Harvey Keitel as DEA Agent John Harris
Iain Glen as Edward Foster
John Wood as Richard Donnelly
Terence Rigby as Sidney Callow
Keith Allen as Jack Doyle
Craig Kelly as Christian O'Neill
Thandie Newton as Rachael Stevens
Viggo Mortensen as Carl Frazer

Music
The music was by David Arnold; Björk's song "Play Dead" and a remix of "Gave Up" by Nine Inch Nails appear in the film.

Reception
The film opened on 88 screens in the United Kingdom on 8 October 1993 and finished eighth for the weekend with a gross of £101,904. It went on to gross £240,576 in the UK.

References

External links

1993 films
1993 crime drama films
American crime drama films
Films scored by David Arnold
Films directed by Danny Cannon
Films produced by Alison Owen
Films set in London
PolyGram Filmed Entertainment films
Working Title Films films
1990s English-language films
1993 directorial debut films
1990s American films